This article covers the squad and match results for the 1994–95 season at the English football (soccer) club Newcastle United F.C. Newcastle United participated in the FA Premier League, finishing in 6th place.

Season summary

Newcastle United made the best start to any top division season in their history, winning their first six games to go top. The first team had built up a reputation for playing an attacking, almost cavalier, brand of football under Kevin Keegan – their occasionally leaky defence was not a major problem, as the team could almost always score more than they conceded. In a shock move in January 1995, however, hugely influential striker Andy Cole joined Manchester United for £6 million plus £1 million midfielder Keith Gillespie, who joined Newcastle. Fans were saddened and confused with Keegan for selling Cole, leading to Keegan publicly confronting fans at St James' Park explaining his reasons on the day of the transfer.

By Christmas, Newcastle were no longer title favourites but still looked certain of a UEFA Cup place. But things failed to improve in the new year, and the sale of Cole seemed to accelerate their fall from grace. A sixth-place finish in the final table meant that they just missed out on another European campaign, but they were given hope of a fresh chase for honours next time round thanks to the close season signings of David Ginola and Les Ferdinand.

The 1994–95 season also saw the arrival of Marc Hottiger, Philippe Albert, Paul Kitson and Keith Gillespie, as well as the late and close season departures of Barry Venison, Alex Mathie, Mike Jeffrey and Paul Bracewell.

Final league table

Appearances, goals and cards
(Substitute appearances in brackets)

Coaching staff

Transfers

In

 Total spending:  £6.175m

Out

 Total income:  £8.025m

Competitions

Pre-season

League

FA Cup

League Cup

UEFA Cup

Matches

Pre-season

League

FA Cup

League Cup

UEFA Cup

References

External links
FootballSquads – Newcastle United – 1994/95
Newcastle United Football Club – Fixtures 1994–95
Transfers (Keegan) – Senior / Reserve Arrivals & Departures
The Great career – Profile
Newcastle United 1994–1995 – statto.com
Player Index – premierleague.com
Season Details – 1994–95 – toon1892

Newcastle United F.C. seasons
Newcastle United